The overseas departments and regions of France (DROM) are departments of France that are outside metropolitan France, the European part of France. They have exactly the same status as mainland France's regions and departments. The French Constitution provides that, in general, French laws and regulations (France's civil code, penal code, administrative law, social laws, tax laws, etc.) apply to French overseas regions the same as in metropolitan France, but can be adapted as needed to suit the region's particular needs. Hence, the local administrations of French overseas regions cannot themselves pass new laws. 

As integral parts of France and the European Union, overseas departments are represented in the National Assembly, Senate, and Economic and Social Council, vote to elect members of the European Parliament (MEP), and also use the euro as their currency. The overseas departments and regions are not the same as the overseas collectivities, which have a semi-autonomous status.

Each overseas department is the sole department in its own overseas region with powers identical to the regions of metropolitan France. Because of the one-to-one correspondence, informal usage does not distinguish the two, and the French media use the term  (DOM) almost exclusively.

Since March 2011, the five overseas departments and regions of France are:

 French Guiana in South America;
 Guadeloupe in the Caribbean;
 Martinique in the Caribbean;
 Mayotte in the Indian Ocean, off the coast of East Africa;
 Réunion in the Indian Ocean, off the coast of East Africa.

Guadeloupe and Réunion each have separate departmental and regional councils, while in Mayotte, Guiana and Martinique, the two layers of government are consolidated so one body wields both sets of powers. The overseas departments acquired these additional powers in 1982, when France's decentralisation policy dictated that they be given elected regional councils and other regional powers; however, the term "overseas region" was only introduced with the French constitutional amendment of 28 March 2003.

History 
France's earliest, short-lived attempt at setting up overseas departments was after Napoleon's conquest of the Republic of Venice in 1797, when the hitherto Venetian Ionian Islands fell to the French Directory and were organised as the departments of Mer-Égée, Ithaque and Corcyre. In 1798 the Russian Admiral Fyodor Ushakov evicted the French from these islands, and though France regained them via the Treaty of Tilsit in 1807, the three departments were not revived.

Under the 1947 Constitution of the Fourth Republic, the French colonies of Algeria in North Africa, Guadeloupe and Martinique in the Caribbean, French Guiana in South America, and Réunion in the Indian Ocean were defined as overseas departments. Algeria became independent in 1962 while the others are still French departments.

Since 1982, following the French government's policy of decentralisation, overseas departments have elected regional councils with powers similar to those of the regions of metropolitan France. As a result of a constitutional revision that occurred in 2003, these regions are now to be called "overseas regions"; indeed, the new wording of the Constitution gives no precedence to the terms "overseas department" or "overseas region," though the latter is still virtually unused by the French media.

The overseas collectivity of Saint Pierre and Miquelon was an overseas department from 1976 to 1985. All five of France's overseas departments have between 200,000 and 1,000,000 people each, whereas Saint Pierre and Miquelon has only about 6,000, and the smaller collectivity unit therefore seemed more appropriate for the islands.

The overseas collectivity of Mayotte held a referendum on 29 March 2009. Of the votes, 95% were in favor of becoming an overseas department. Mayotte became an overseas department on 31 March 2011.

Demographics

See also 
 Administrative divisions of France
 Outre-mer
 Overseas France
 Overseas Territories of France (European Parliament constituency)
 Overseas territory
 Single territorial collectivity
 Special member state territories and the European Union

References

External links 
  Ministry of the overseas departments and territories
  past and current developments of France's overseas administrative divisions like DOMs and TOMs

 
Integral overseas territories